Rent regulation in England and Wales is the part of English land law that creates rights and obligations for tenants and landlords. The main areas of regulation concern,

the mechanisms for regulating prices (historically called "rent control"). Since the Housing Act 1980, prices are generally left for landlords to fix.
the reasons that a person can be evicted. Since the Housing Act 1996, most tenancies can be terminated on their expiry for any reason.
the obligations to repair and maintain the property under the Landlord and Tenant Act 1985.

In general, people renting homes or real property may agree with a landlord to any contract terms they like, but some rights and duties are made compulsory. Historically, the United Kingdom sought to ensure fair rents, prevent evictions without a fair reason, and placed obligations on landlords to properly maintain premises. Such regulation seeks to redress the inequality of bargaining power between landlords and tenants in a market where there is unlimited freedom of contract. Most rights for tenants were abolished by the Housing Act 1980 and in subsequent legislation through the 1980s. The remaining legislation is found in the Landlord and Tenant Act 1954, which gives rights to business tenants, and the Landlord and Tenant Act 1985 which gives some rights, although fewer, to people renting for the purpose of a home.

History

Before the 20th century, and during the industrial revolution, the regulation of the rental property relationship was largely left to the market. The first major regulation was introduced by the Rents and Mortgage Interest Restriction Act 1915, largely as a consequence of rent strikes in Glasgow.

Regulation

Tenancy contract
Marchant v Charters [1977] 1 WLR 1181, Lord Denning MR, a person has a lease when the occupant had a ‘stake in the room or did he have only permission for himself personally to occupy’ it? 
Johnson v Moreton [1980] AC 37, 66, Lord Simon, ‘There was one economic and social relationship where it was claimed that there were palpably lacking the prerequisites for the beneficent operation of laisser-faire - that of landlord and tenant. The market was limited and sluggish: the supply of land could not expand immediately and flexibly in response to demand, and even humble dwellings took more time to erect than those in want of them could spare. Generally, a man became a tenant rather than an owner-occupier because his circumstances compelled him to live hand-to-mouth; the landlord’s purse was generally longer and his command of knowledge and counsel far greater than the tenant’s. In short, it was held, the constriction of the market and the inequality of bargaining power enabled the landlord to dictate contractual terms which did not necessarily operate to the general benefit of society. It was to counteract this descried constriction of the market and to redress this descried inequality of bargaining power that the law - specifically, in the shape of legislation - came to intervene repeatedly to modify freedom of contract between landlord and tenant.’
Bankway Properties Ltd v Pensfold-Dunsford [2001] 1 WLR 1369, Arden LJ, [42]-[44]

Right to repairs
Bruton v London & Quadrant Housing Trust [1999] UKHL 26
Landlord and Tenant Act 1985

Security of tenure
Security of tenure exists for business tenancies under the Landlord and Tenant Act 1954. It was abolished for most residential properties by the Housing Act 1988. However, it remains for some people who live in council houses.

Protection from Eviction Act 1977
Assured tenancy
Assured shorthold tenancy

Rental price controls
The Rent Act 1977 was the last piece of legislation in England and Wales to place limits on how much landlords could raise prices for residential homes. It was substantially repealed by the Housing Act 1988.

Regulators and Ombudsman
The Property Ombudsman

See also
English land law
Rent regulation
Vernon v Bethell (1762) 28 ER 838
Rent-seeking
Land tenure in England

Notes

References
R Arnott, ‘Time for Revisionism on Rent Control?’ (1995) 9(1) Journal of Economic Perspectives 99
A Anas, ‘Rent Control with Matching Economies: A Model of European Housing Market Regulation’ (1997) 15(1) Journal of Real Estate Finance and Economics 111–37
S Bright, "Avoiding Tenancy Legislation: Sham and Contracting Out Revisited" [2002] CLJ 146
S Bright, Landlord and Tenant Law in Context (2007)
T Ellingsen and P Englund, 'Rent regulation: An introduction' (2003) 10 Swedish Economic Policy Review 3
M Haffner, M Elsinga and J Hoekstra, 'Rent Regulation: The Balance between Private Landlords and Tenants in Six European Countries' (2008) 8(2) International Journal of Housing Policy 217
H Lind, 'Rent Regulation: A Conceptual and Comparative Analysis' (2001) 1(1) International Journal of Housing Policy 41
C Rapkin, The Private Rental Housing Market in New York City (1966)
G Sternlieb, The Urban Housing Dilemma (1972)
P Weitzman, 'Economics and Rent Regulation: A Call for a New Perspective' (1984-1985) 13 NYU Review of Legal and Social Change 975-988

English land law
Britain
Regulation in the United Kingdom